Kenneth Joseph Marino (born December 19, 1968) is an American actor, comedian, director, and screenwriter. He was a cast member on MTV's The State and has starred in shows such as Party Down, Marry Me, Burning Love, and Childrens Hospital. He played the Lehman brothers on the Showtime series Black Monday. He also stars as Victor in the cult-classic comedy film Wet Hot American Summer, as well as its spin-offs.

Early life
Marino was born on Long Island, New York, to an Italian-American family. He attended West Islip High School in West Islip, New York. He then studied at the Lee Strasberg Institute and Tisch School of the Arts at New York University in New York City.

On Marino's first day at NYU, he met David Wain and Craig Wedren and quickly befriended both of them; Marino was popular in part because he had milk crates full of bottles of alcoholic beverages (which he had stolen the previous summer at a job at a yacht club), and he carried the crates around with him when he visited people's dorm rooms. The next year, Wain and Marino were among the co-founders of a comedy troupe called The New Group, which eventually was renamed to The State.

Career
After college, Marino continued working and performing with The State. From 1992 to 1993, Marino and several other members of The State appeared on the MTV sketch comedy series You Wrote It, You Watch It, hosted by Jon Stewart; later in 1993, the entire troupe gained their own sketch comedy series on MTV, The State. The series ran until 1995. In 1997, Marino co-starred with Rob Schneider in the second season of Men Behaving Badly. He starred in the short lived series First Years in 2001, and had a recurring role as Prof. Wilder on the TV series Dawson's Creek (2001–2002) . He made multiple appearances on Charmed and Rock Me Baby, and appeared in four seasons of Veronica Mars as private detective Vinnie Van Lowe. He was cast to star in a remake of the TV series The Courtship of Eddie's Father, but the pilot was not picked up. Instead, he was cast in the Starz original series Party Down. He played a gay demon on the TV series Reaper, Dr. Glenn Richie in the satirical television series Childrens Hospital and Captain 'CJ' Stentley on the show Brooklyn Nine-Nine.

Marino also made guest appearances in Will & Grace (in the season 3 episode, "Three's a Crowd, Six Is a Freakshow"), Angel (season 1), Reno 911! (Season 1, Episode 2 and Season 3, Episode 3), Stella (season 1), Grey's Anatomy (season 2), Monk (in season 3's "Mr. Monk Takes His Medicine"), Private Practice (season 3), and Happy Endings (season 2, episode 10, "The Shrink, the Dare, Her Date and Her Brother").

Marino starred in 2004's Love for Rent. He can also be seen in a non-speaking role as the music producer/board operator in the pre-ride film that accompanies Rock 'n' Roller Coaster at Disney's Hollywood Studios. He had a cameo in the end of The Baxter. He also starred in the Hallmark Channel movie Falling in Love with the Girl Next Door in 2006. In 2009, he had a cameo in an episode of Californication.

Marino wrote the screenplay for Diggers (2006), a coming-of-age film set in mid-1970s Long Island. Along with fellow The State member David Wain, he wrote and produced the films The Ten (2007), Role Models (2008) and Wanderlust (2012), all directed by Wain; Marino also had small acting roles in all three films. He played Todd, the strip club manager, alongside Jennifer Aniston in the 2013 film We're The Millers. He also appeared in Wain's 2001 film Wet Hot American Summer.

He appears as Guy Young, a sports television host, in season 4 of HBO's Eastbound & Down.

Marino starred as Mark Orlando in the Yahoo! web series Burning Love, a spoof of the TV series The Bachelor and The Bachelorette. The series was created by his wife Erica Oyama, while Marino also directed all three seasons. Afterward, Marino starred opposite Casey Wilson on the NBC sitcom Marry Me, which ran for one season from 2014 to 2015.

In 2016, he starred in the second season of Marvel's series Agent Carter as mobster Joseph Manfredi.

Marino has also directed several episodes of the sitcoms The Goldbergs, Super Fun Night, Childrens Hospital, and Trophy Wife.

In 2017, Marino starred as Mr. Johnson in the Netflix comedy-horror film The Babysitter. He reprised his role in the sequel The Babysitter: Killer Queen.

Since 2019, Marino has starred as music manager Streeter in the HBO comedy series The Other Two.

Personal life
Marino is married to screenwriter Erica Oyama. They have two children.

Filmography

Film

Television

Other projects

References

External links

Ken Marino Interview @ Heavy In The Streets
Children's Hospital streaming episodes on theWB
Burning Love

1968 births
Living people
20th-century American male actors
21st-century American male actors
American sketch comedians
American male comedians
21st-century American comedians
American male film actors
American male television actors
American male screenwriters
American television directors
Television producers from New York (state)
American television writers
American people of Italian descent
Male actors from New York (state)
People from West Islip, New York
Tisch School of the Arts alumni
American male television writers
Streamy Award winners
Screenwriters from New York (state)
Comedy film directors